William Mansell may refer to:

William Mansell, gamekeeper, see Clumber Spaniel
William Clifford (priest), alias Mansell
William Mansell, owner of James Hayday bookbinders

See also
William Mansel (disambiguation)